Kello Rovers Football Club are a Scottish football club, based in the town of Kirkconnel, Dumfries and Galloway. Nicknamed Super K, they were formed in 1903, and they play at Nithside Park.

The team have been managed since June 2017 by John Quinn. 

Greg Gallagher is the new manager for the 2022/23 season.

Notable former players
 Davie Irons - Ayr United, Clydebank, Partick Thistle, Dunfermline Athletic, Gretna
 Kris Doolan - Partick Thistle
 George Cloy - Queen of the South
 Martyn Campbell - Ayr United
 Alex Parker - Everton
 Willie Ferguson - Queen of the South
 Quinton Young - Ayr United, Coventry City, Rangers, East Fife
 Andy Paton - Motherwell

References

External links 
 Club website
 Facebook
 Twitter

Association football clubs established in 1903
Football clubs in Scotland
Scottish Junior Football Association clubs
Football clubs in Dumfries and Galloway
1903 establishments in Scotland
West of Scotland Football League teams